The men's discus throw at the 1946 European Athletics Championships was held in Oslo, Norway, at Bislett Stadion on 24 August 1946.

Medalists

Results

Final
24 August

Qualification
24 August

Participation
According to an unofficial count, 16 athletes from 11 countries participated in the event.

 (1)
 (1)
 (1)
 (2)
 (1)
 (2)
 (2)
 (1)
 (2)
 (2)
 (1)

References

Discus throw
Discus throw at the European Athletics Championships